Brewcaria hechtioides is a plant species in the genus Brewcaria. This species is endemic to Venezuela.

References

hechtioides
Flora of Venezuela